Jan Wittenberg (born 26 February 1943, Deventer) is a Dutch sprint canoer who competed in the mid to late 1960s. Competing in two Summer Olympics, he earned his best finish of seventh in the K-4 1000 m at Tokyo in 1964.

References
Sports-reference.com profile

1943 births
Living people
Canoeists at the 1964 Summer Olympics
Canoeists at the 1968 Summer Olympics
Dutch male canoeists
Olympic canoeists of the Netherlands
Sportspeople from Deventer